Zbyněk Hrdel (born August 19, 1985) is a Czech former professional ice hockey player. He was selected by the Tampa Bay Lightning in the 9th round (286th overall) of the 2003 NHL Entry Draft.

Hrdel played with BK Mladá Boleslav in the Czech Extraliga during the 2010–11 Czech Extraliga season.

Career statistics

Regular season and playoffs

International

References

External links

1985 births
Living people
HC Berounští Medvědi players
Czech ice hockey forwards
Dunaújvárosi Acélbikák players
Gothiques d'Amiens players
Rytíři Kladno players
HC Sparta Praha players
Johnstown Chiefs players
Mississippi Sea Wolves players
BK Mladá Boleslav players
Norfolk Admirals players
Piráti Chomutov players
Rimouski Océanic players
Springfield Falcons players
Tampa Bay Lightning draft picks
Sportspeople from Písek
Czech expatriate sportspeople in Hungary
Czech expatriate sportspeople in France
Expatriate ice hockey players in France
Expatriate ice hockey players in Hungary
Czech expatriate ice hockey players in Germany
Czech expatriate ice hockey players in Canada
Czech expatriate ice hockey players in the United States